Ashley Fuller (born 14 November 1986 in Bedford) is an English footballer playing for Kempston Rovers in the Evo-Stik Southern League Division One South & West. He has previously played for Cambridge United in Football League Two and Gravesend & Northfleet, Cambridge City and Kettering Town.

References

1986 births
Living people
English footballers
Cambridge United F.C. players
Ebbsfleet United F.C. players
Bishop's Stortford F.C. players
Cambridge City F.C. players
Sportspeople from Bedford
English Football League players
Association football midfielders
Footballers from Bedfordshire